Awet Gebremedhin Andemeskel (born 5 February 1992 in Kakebda) is an Eritrean-born Swedish cyclist, who most recently rode for UCI Continental team . In May 2019, he was named in the startlist for the 2019 Giro d'Italia.

Major results
2013
 2nd Overall Fenkel Northern Redsea
 6th Overall Tour of Eritrea
2018
 10th Prueba Villafranca de Ordizia
2019
 4th Road race, National Road Championships
2020 
 7th Overall Tour du Rwanda

Grand Tour general classification results timeline

References

External links

1992 births
Living people
Eritrean male cyclists
Swedish male cyclists
Swedish people of Eritrean descent
Swedish sportspeople of African descent